Dina Mangabeira (20 August 1923 – 11 February 2000) was a Brazilian poet and literary critic.

She was born in Bocaiúva on a farm called "Morro Agudo", into a traditional family from northern Minas Gerais. 
"Mangabeira", the family name, came from her grandfather, who collected mangabas of Minas Gerais and Bahia, to make rubber.

Moving to Montes Claros when she was two years old, Mangabeira was a teacher from 1945 until 1948, when she married and devoted her free time to writing poetry. 
Mangabeira was a member of the Minas Gerais Academy of Women Writers.

She died in Belo Horizonte from complications of a cancer.

References

Brazilian women poets
1923 births
2000 deaths
20th-century Brazilian poets
20th-century Brazilian women writers
Brazilian literary critics
Women literary critics
Deaths from cancer in Minas Gerais
People from Minas Gerais